Vojtěch Stránský (born 13 March 2003) is a Czech footballer who currently plays as a forward for Mladá Boleslav.

Career statistics

Club

Notes

References

2003 births
Living people
Czech footballers
Czech Republic youth international footballers
Association football forwards
Czech First League players
FK Mladá Boleslav players